KYE or Kye may refer to:

 Kye (given name)
 Kye (video game)
 Kye Hill, Huntly, Aberdeenshire
 KYE Systems, a Taiwanese computer peripheral manufacturer
 Key Monastery, Lahaul & Spiti District, Himachal Pradesh, India
 Cows, in Scotland and northern England
 The Korean variant of rotating savings and credit association
 An initialism of Know Your Enemy (disambiguation)